Ağzıbir (also, Agzybir) is a village and municipality in the Agdash Rayon of Azerbaijan.  It has a population of 1,665.

History

Geographical position 
Coordinates: 40°24′34″N 47°23′20″E

Climate

Population 
1665 person

Economy

Culture

External links

Populated places in Agdash District